Sanci may refer to:

 Sancı, Alaca, a village in Turkey
 Sanchi, an ancient Buddhist complex in India
 Sancy, a diamond

See also 
 Sansi (disambiguation)